Karel Petrů (24 January 1891 in Březové Hory – 1949) was the coach of the Czechoslovakia national football team when they finished second in the 1934 FIFA World Cup.

1891 births
1949 deaths
Czechoslovak football managers
1934 FIFA World Cup managers
Czechoslovakia national football team managers
Sportspeople from Příbram
People from the Kingdom of Bohemia